George Leon Argyros (born February 4, 1937) is an American former diplomat who served as the United States Ambassador to Spain. He is also a real estate investor and philanthropist. Argyros was the owner of Major League Baseball's Seattle Mariners from 1981 to 1989. He is the founder and CEO of property firm Arnel & Affiliates.

Early and personal life
George Argyros was born on February 4, 1937, in Detroit, Michigan, but raised in Pasadena, California. Argyros is a second-generation American citizen; his grandparents emigrated from Greece. Argyros graduated from Chapman University in 1959 with a major in Business and Economics. He later served on Chapman University's board of trustees, including chairman of the board from 1976 to 2001. The Chapman University, Argyros School of Business and Economics is named in his honor.

Argyros and his wife, Julia, have three grown children and seven grandchildren. His son George Argyros Jr. (b. 2/5/1965 - d. 8/28/2020) died of a heart attack at the age of 55

Business
Argyros made his fortune in real estate investments. He originally started his business career running a grocery store and moved on to buying and selling real estate to gas stations. He also was involved in buying and selling property in Southern California. From 1981 to 1989, he was the owner of the Seattle Mariners baseball team.

Argyros has done business through the real estate company Arnel & Affiliates (DBA "Arnel Property Management Company"). Arnel & Affiliates does business primarily in Southern California. Argyros has a net worth around $2 billion and owns around 5,500 apartments in Orange County and nearly 2 million square feet of commercial real estate in Southern California.

Politics
Argyros served as a member of the Advisory Committee for Trade Policy and Negotiations for the U.S. Trade Ambassador. He resigned from that position in 1990, when President Bush appointed him to the board of the Federal Home Loan Mortgage Corporation (FreddieMac). He completed his term on the FreddieMac Board in March 1993.

In 2001 Argyros was appointed Ambassador to Spain and Andorra. He was sworn in on November 21, 2001. Many viewed the appointment as a political reward for his fund raising efforts for the Republican Party.

Baseball
In 1981, Argyros bought the Seattle Mariners. Argyros sold the team to Jeff Smulyan in 1989. Argyros had openly tried to purchase the San Diego Padres in 1987 and to sell the Mariners to local buyers, but a final deal was never consummated with Padres owner Joan Kroc.

Philanthropy
In October 2013, George and Julia Argyros announced two $1 million donations benefiting the arts in Julia's hometown of Adrian, Michigan. One was to help kick off a $3.5 million capital campaign for the Croswell Opera House and another was to benefit a fine arts education endowment through the Adrian Schools Educational Foundation.

The family foundation pledged $7.5 million in January 2018 for the purposes of renovating the Los Angeles Coliseum. Argyros also donated money towards the construction of the Performing Arts Center, named after him, at the American School of Madrid.

Argyros is on the board of directors of the Richard Nixon Foundation, which operates the Richard Nixon Presidential Library and Museum in Yorba Linda, California; he is also a longtime trustee of his alma mater Chapman University. He is a trustee of California Institute of Technology, and also a board-member for the Center for Strategic and International Studies in Washington, D.C.

See also
List of billionaires

References

External links

1937 births
Living people
Baseball executives
Businesspeople from Detroit
American people of Greek descent
People from Pasadena, California
Ambassadors of the United States to Spain
American billionaires
Seattle Mariners owners
Major League Baseball owners
Chapman University alumni
California Institute of Technology trustees
California Republicans
Real estate and property developers
21st-century American diplomats